Sahana Bajpaie (born 6 February) is an Indian singer-songwriter and a contemporary Rabindra Sangeet vocalist in Bengali. Born in Santiniketan, by the age of three she started singing. She released her debut album Notun Kore Pabo Bole in 2007 from Dhaka, Bangladesh, which was a collection of Rabindra Sangeet. Her second album Shikawr released in 2014 with several musicians from West Bengal. Sahana's second Rabindra Sangeet album Ja Bolo Tai Bolo was released in 2015 and the latest solo album, Mon Bandhibi Kemone in 2016.

In 2012, she made her first playback in the Indian Bengali fantasy film Tasher Desh directed by Q. Alongside Shayan Chowdhury Arnob, she has written several songs.

Music career

Rabindra Sangeet
Since her music career Bajpaie released two Rabindra Sangeet albums. Notun Kore Pabo Bole was her debut album which was released on 6 March 2007, from Bengal Music Company, Dhaka. The album contained representation and arrangement of Tagore-songs.

She released her second Rabindra Sangeet album Ja Bolo Tai Bolo in September, 2015 in India and Bangladesh, which contained a collection of devotional and folk songs of Tagore.

Later years
Her third solo album Mon Bandhibi Kemone released in 2016, was a collection of folk songs of Bengal, which Bajpaie and her associates had collected and arranged them in a contemporary format. Music arrangement of this album was done by Samantak Sinha and Satyaki Banerjee.

Playback
In 2012, she made her first playback in the Indian Bengali fantasy film Tasher Desh. In 2013, Bengali comedy film Hawa Bodol which was directed by Parambrata Chattopadhyay. In 2016, she made a playback for the Bengali film Under Construction, and sang for Family Album by Mainak Bhaumik, which was a tune by Anupam Roy. In 2018, she sang for two films Ek Je Chhilo Raja, a film by Srijit Mukherjee and Rainbow Jelly, by Soukarya Ghosal. More recently, in the Shiboprasad and Nandita directed, Kontho, she sang the song, Shawbai Chup.

Personal life
In 2001, Bajpaie married her childhood friend Shayan Chowdhury Arnob, a Bengali musician, singer-songwriter and composer from Bangladesh. They got divorced in 2008. She now resides in London, where she serves as a senior teaching fellow in Bengali in the Department of the Languages and Cultures of South Asia at SOAS South Asia Institute. She is however currently, on leave, pursuing her PhD in ethnomusicology at King's College London. Later she married Richard Herrett and the couple have a daughter name Rohini Herrett.

Discography

Studio albums 
 Notun Kore Pabo Bole (2007)
 Shikawr (2014)
 Ja Bolo Tai Bolo (2015)
 Mon Bandhibi Kemone (2016)

Playback

References

External links 
 
 

Year of birth missing (living people)
21st-century Indian women singers
21st-century Indian singers
Living people
Bengali singers
Bengali Hindus
Academics of SOAS University of London
Alumni of SOAS University of London
People from Birbhum district
Singers from West Bengal
Women musicians from West Bengal
BRAC University people